Jonathan Haskell (March 19, 1755 – December 14, 1814) was an officer in the United States Army who served as acting Adjutant General and acting Inspector General of the U.S. Army in 1796. After the war he returned to farm in Belpre, Ohio.

See also
List of Adjutant Generals of the U.S. Army
List of Inspectors General of the U.S. Army

References

1755 births
1814 deaths
Adjutants general of the United States Army
American people of the Northwest Indian War
Continental Army officers from Massachusetts
Inspectors General of the United States Army
People from Belpre, Ohio
People from Rochester, Massachusetts